Guitar pop may refer to:
Pop rock, a genre fusing pop music, rock music, and sometimes doo-wop. It is occasionally known as guitar pop
Acoustic music, a genre in which songs are performed on an acoustic guitar, and can include pop music compositions, where it can also be referred to as acoustic pop, especially if light orchestral accompaniment is present.